The 2008–09 Ligue 1 season was the 71st since its establishment. Bordeaux became champions for the sixth time on the last weekend of the season. The fixtures were announced on 23 May 2008. The season began on 9 August 2008 and ended on 30 May 2009. A total of 20 teams contested the league, consisting of 17 who competed the previous season and three that were promoted from France's second division Ligue 2.

Bordeaux consecutively won their last 11 league games of the season and clinched the title on 30 May 2009 after the 1–0 victory against Caen. This was Bordeaux's sixth title and their first since the 1998–99 season. Bordeaux's title victory ended a historic run for Lyon, who had won seven consecutive titles beginning with the 2001–02 season. Le Havre, Nantes and Caen were relegated to Ligue 2. Both Le Havre and Nantes were promoted from Ligue 2 last season. Marseille, Lyon, Toulouse and Lille all secured European football for the 2009–10 season through their league position.

Teams

Promotion and relegation
RC Lens, RC Strasbourg and FC Metz were relegated to the 2008–09 Ligue 2 after finishing in the bottom three spots of the table at the end of the 2007–08 season. Lens were relegated to the Ligue 2 after 17 seasons of continuous membership in the top football league of France, while Strasbourg and Metz made their immediate return to the second level.

The three relegated teams were replaced by three 2007–08 Ligue 2 sides. Champions Le Havre, who terminated their second-level status after five years, runners-up FC Nantes, who returned to the top flight after one season in second level and Grenoble Foot 38 returned to highest French league for first time after 35 years.

Stadia and locations

Managers

Kits

League table

Results

Season statistics

Top goalscorers
Source: Ligue 1 

André-Pierre Gignac won the Trophée du Meilleur Buteur.

Awards

Monthly awards

UNFP Player of the Month

Annual awards
Here are shown the nominees for Ligue 1 annual awards. The winners, displayed in bold, were determined at the annual UNFP Awards on 24 May 2009.

Player of the Year

Young Player of the Year

Keeper of the Year

Manager of the Year

Team of the Year

References

External links

 Ligue 1 official website

Ligue 1 seasons
France
1